Asturoceras is an extinct late Paleozoic ammonoid cephalopod genus belonging to the Goniatitida, named by  Ruzhencev and Bogoslovskaya in 1969.

As for its family, the Dimorphoceratidae, the shell of Asturoceras is completely involute, with a closed umbilicus, and the ventral lobe becomes extremely wide during growth by subdivision. In Asturoceras at maturity the ventral lobe has six bifid branches.

Fossils of this genus were found in Spain and England.

Related genera
Dimorphoceras
Trizonoceras

References

 Paleobiology Database Asturoceras entry
 GONIAT Online

Dimorphoceratidae
Goniatitida genera
Carboniferous ammonites
Ammonites of Europe